Sensis may refer to:

Sensis (company), an Australian marketing services company
Saab Sensis Corporation, a private company specializing in air traffic control and defense systems

See also
Sensi (disambiguation)